1993 Czech Lion Awards ceremony was held on 25 February 1994.

Winners

Non-statutory Awards

References

1993 film awards
Czech Lion Awards ceremonies